The 2005 Houston Astros season was the 44th season for the Major League Baseball (MLB) franchise in Houston, Texas. They qualified for the postseason for the second consecutive season and it was the sixth time they had done so in a span of nine seasons. Expectations had been raised since the Astros had come one win away from a pennant the previous year. However, they got to a sluggish 15–30 start. They then went on to win 74 of the next 117 games to claim the wild card playoff spot, and would go on to win the National League pennant to advance to the World Series for the first time in franchise history, which gave them the privilege of hosting the first World Series game in the state of Texas. However, they were swept by the Chicago White Sox in the World Series. It was longtime Astros first baseman Jeff Bagwell's final season and first World Series appearance.

However, it was also the last playoff appearance for ten seasons, as a slow decline swept in following the retirements of players such as Bagwell.

Offseason

Overview

In February, 2005, longtime Astros players Jeff Bagwell and Craig Biggio were jointly inducted into the Texas Sports Hall of Fame.

Transactions

January 7, 2005: Adam Riggs was signed as a free agent with the Houston Astros.
January 7, 2005: Turk Wendell was signed as a free agent with the Houston Astros.
January 23, 2005: John Franco signed as a free agent with the Houston Astros.
February 11, 2005: Trenidad Hubbard was signed as a free agent with the Houston Astros.

Regular season

Overview
After starting the season with a 15–30 won–loss record, the Astros improved to 74–43 over their final 117 games to capture the NL wild card.

Bagwell hit his last major league home run against Greg Maddux on April 29, tying him for the most against any pitcher with seven.

Standings

National League Central

Record vs. opponents

Transactions
April 9, 2005: Brooks Kieschnick was signed as a free agent with the Houston Astros.
April 27, 2005: Trenidad Hubbard was released by the Houston Astros.

Roster

Player stats

Batting
Note: G = Games played; AB = At bats; R = Runs; H = Hits; 2B = Doubles; 3B = Triples; HR = Home runs; RBI = Runs batted in; SB = Stolen bases; BB = Walks; AVG = Batting average; SLG = Slugging average

Source:

Pitching
Note: W = Wins; L = Losses; ERA = Earned run average; G = Games pitched; GS = Games started; SV = Saves; IP = Innings pitched; H = Hits allowed; R = Runs allowed; ER = Earned runs allowed; BB = Walks allowed; SO = Strikeouts

Source:

Lone Star series
The annual interleague games between the Houston Astros and the Texas Rangers were played in June and July. They are known as the Lone Star Series.

Game Log

Regular season

|-  style="text-align:center; background:#bfb;"
|- style="background:#fbb;"
| 1 || April 5 || Cardinals || 3–7 || Carpenter (1–0) || Oswalt (0–1) || Isringhausen (1) || Minute Maid Park || 43,567 || 0–1 || L1
|- style="background:#bfb;"
| 2 || April 6 || Cardinals || 4–1 || Qualls (1–0) || Tavarez (0–1) || Lidge (1) || Minute Maid Park || 28,496 || 1–1 || W1
|- style="background:#bfb;"
| 3 || April 8 || Reds || 3–2 || Clemens (1–0) || Belisle (0–1) || Lidge (2) || Minute Maid Park || 36,382 || 2–1 || W2
|- style="background:#bfb;"
| 4 || April 9 || Reds || 4–3 || Lidge (1–0) || Wagner (0–1) ||  || Minute Maid Park || 34,502 || 3–1 || W3
|- style="background:#bfb;"
| 5 || April 10 || Reds || 5–2 || Oswalt (1–1) || Milton (1–1) || Lidge (3) || Chase Field || 31,832 || 4–1 || W4
|- style="background:#fcc;"
| 6 || April 11 || @ Mets || 4–8 || Hernandez (1–0) || Springer (0–1) || — || Shea Stadium || 53,663 || 4–2 || L1
|- style="background:#fcc;" 
| 7 || April 13 || @ Mets || 0–1  || DeJean (1–0) || Wheeler (0–1) || — || Shea Stadium || 22,431|| 4–3 || L2
|- style="background:#fcc;" 
| 8 || April 14 || @ Mets || 3–4 || Mike Matthews (1–0) || Franco (0–1) || Looper (1) || Shea Stadium || 17,214 || 4–4 || L3
|- style="background:#bfb;" 
| 9 || April 15 || @ Reds || 11–2 || Oswalt (2–1) || Paul Wilson (0–1) || — || Great American Ball Park || 31,740 || 5–4 || W1
|- style="background:#fcc;"
| 10 || April 16 || Reds || 2–3 || Eric Brewerston (2–1) || Pettitte (0–1) || Graves (3) || Great American Ball Park || 42,646 || 5–5 || L1
|- style="background:#fcc;"
| 11 || April 17 || Reds || 5–6 || Wagner (1–1) || Qualls (1—1) || Graves (4) || Great American Ball Park || 25,762 || 5–6 || L2
|- style="background:#fcc;" 
| 12 || April 18 || Braves || 0–1 || Sosa (1–0) || Wheeler (0–2) || Kolb (4) || Minute Maid Park || 31,672 || 5–7 || L3
|- style="background:#bfb;" 
| 13 || April 19 || Braves || 5–3 || Backe (1–0) || Thomson (1–2) || Lidge (4) || Minute Maid Park || 32,146 || 6–7 || W1
|- style="background:#bfb;"
| 14 || April 20 || Brewers || 6–1 || Oswalt (3–1) || Sheets (1–3) || — || Minute Maid Park || 26,119 || 7–7 || W2
|- style="background:#bfb;" 
| 15 || April 21 || Brewers || 8–7 || Pettitte (1–1) || Davis (2–2) || Lidge (5) || Minute Maid Park || 39,534 || 8–7 || W3
|- style="background:#fcc;" 
| 16 || April 22 || @ Cardinals || 7–8 || Marquis (3–0) || Duckworth (0–1) || Isringhausen (6) || Busch Memorial Stadium || 44,805 || 8–8 || L1
|- style="background:#fcc;" 
| 17 || April 23 || @ Cardinals || 0–1  || Mulder (2–1) || Chad Qualls (1–2) || — || Busch Memorial Stadium || 40,058 || 8–9 || L2
|- style="background:#fcc;" 
| 18 || April 24 || @ Cardinals || 5–8 || Morris (2–0) || Backe (1–1) || Isringhausen (7) || Busch Memorial Stadium || 39,020 || 8–10 || L3
|- style="background:#fcc;" 
| 19 || April 25 || @ Pirates || 0–2 || Perez (1–2) || Oswalt (3–2) || Mesa (7)|| PNC Park || 8,413 || 8–11 || L4
|- style="background:#fcc;" 
| 20 || April 27 || @ Pirates || 0–2 || Wells (2–3) || Pettitte (1–2) || Mesa (8) || PNC Park || 13,426|| 8–12 || L5
|- style="background:#fcc;" 
| 21 || April 29 || Cubs || 2–3 || Maddux (1–1) || Clemens (1–1) || Hawkins (4) || Minute Maid Park || 41,232 || 8–13 || L6
|- style="background:#bfb;"
| 22 || April 30 || Cubs || 7–5 || Backe (2–1) || Bartosh (0–1) ||  || Minute Maid Park || 41,615 || 9–13 || W1
|-

|- style="background:#bfb;" 
| 23 || May 1 || Cubs || 9–3 || Oswalt (4–2) || Prior (3–1) || || Minute Maid Park || 38,014 || 10–13 || W2
|- style="background:#bfb;" 
| 24 || May 2 || Pirates || 11–4 || Pettitte (2–2) || Fogg (1–2) || — || Minute Maid Park || 23,882 || 11–13 || W3
|- style="background:#fcc;" 
| 25 || May 3 || Pirates || 4–7 || White (1–2) || Qualls (1–3) || Mesa (9) || Minute Maid Park || 27,809 || 11–14 || L1
|- style="background:#fcc;" 
| 26 || May 4 || Pirates || 4–6 || Torres (2–1) || Lidge (1–1) || Mesa (10) || Minute Maid Park || 29,299 || 11–15 || L2
|- style="background:#fcc;" 
| 27 || May 5 || @ Braves || 3–9 || Thomson (3–2) || Backe (2–2) ||  || Turner Field || 20,553 || 11–16 || L3
|- style="background:#fcc;" 
| 28 || May 6 || @ Braves || 4–9 || Smoltz (3–3) || Oswalt (4–3) || || Turner Field || 26,987 || 11–17 || L4
|- style="background:#bcc;" 
| 29 || May 7 || @ Braves || 5–0 || Ramirez (2–2) || Pettitte (2–3) || Kolb (9) || Turner Field || 36,452 || 11–18 || L5
|- style="background:#fcc;" 
| 30 || May 8 || @ Braves || 0–16 || Hampton (4–1) || Astacio (0–1) || — || Turner Field || 32,498 || 11–19 || L6
|- style="background:#bfb;" 
| 31 || May 9 || @ Marlins || 2–1 || Clemens (2–0) || Burnett (3–3) || Lidge (6) || Dolphins Stadium || 20,539 || 12–19 || W1
|- style="background:#fcc;" 
| 32 || May 10 || @ Marlins || 2–6 || Mecir (1–0) || Springer (0–2) || — || Dolphins Stadium || 11,687 || 12–20 || L1
|- style="background:#fcc;" 
| 33 || May 11 || @ Marlins || 1–2 || Willis (7–0) || Oswalt (4–4) || Jones (3) || Dolphins Stadium || 21,789|| 12–21 || L2
|- style="background:#fcc;" 
| 34 || May 12 || Giants || 3–6 || Hennessey (2–0) || Pettitte (2–4) || Walker (2) || Minute Maid Park || 29,126 || 12–22 || L3
|- style="background:#fcc;" 
| 35 || May 13 || Giants || 2–4 || Rueter (2–2) || Astacio (0–2) || Walker (3) || Minute Maid Park || 31,365 || 12–23 || L4
|- style="background:#bfb;" 
| 36 || May 14 || Giants || 4–1 || Clemens (3–1) || Tomko (3–5) || Lidge (7) || Minute Maid Park || 41,323 || 13–23 || W1
|- style="background:#bfb;" 
| 37 || May 15 || Giants || 9–0 || Backe (3–2) || Fassero (0–1) || || Minute Maid Park || 33,633 || 14–23 || W2
|- style="background:#bfb;"
| 38 || May 17 || Diamondbacks || 3–0 || Oswalt (5–4) || Vazquez (4–3) || Lidge (8) || Minute Maid Park || 27,156 || 15–23 || W1
|- style="background:#fcc;" 
| 39 || May 18 || Diamondbacks || 6–7 || Ortiz (4–2) || Pettitte (2–5) || Bruney (3) || Minute Maid Park || 27,790 || 15–24 || L1
|- style="background:#fcc;"
| 40 || May 19 || Diamondbacks || 1–6 || Halsey (3–2) || Clemens (3–2) || Valverde (1) || Minute Maid Park || 32,132 || 15–25 || L2
|- style="background:#fcc;" 
| 41 || May 20 || @ Rangers || 3–7 || Rogers (5–2) || Backe (3–3) || || Ameriquest Field in Arlington || 37,187 || 15–26 || L3
|- style="background:#fcc;" 
| 42 || May 21 || @ Rangers || 3–18 || Young (4–2) || Astacio (0–3) || || Ameriquest Field in Arlington || 35,781 || 15–27 || L3
|- style="background:#fcc;" 
| 43 || May 22 || @ Rangers || 0–2 || Park (4–1) || Oswalt (5–5) || Cordero (14) || Ameriquest Field in Arlington || 40,583 || 15–28 || L4
|- style="background:#fcc;"
| 44 || May 23 || @ Cubs ||1–4 || Rusch (3–1) || Rodriguez (0–1) || Dempster (3) || Wrigley Field || 38,232 || 15–29 || L5
|- style="background:#fcc;"
| 45 || May 24 || @ Cubs || 2–4 || Wuertz (3–2) || Lidge (1–2) || Dempster (4) || Wrigley Field || 38,805 || 15–30 || L5
|- style="background:#bfb;" 
| 46 || May 25 || @ Cubs || 5–1 || Backe (4–3) || Maddux (2–3) || || Wrigley Field || 38,118 || 16–30 || W1
|- style="background:#fcc;" 
| 47 || May 27 || @ Brewers || 0–3 || Davis (6–5) || Oswalt (5–6) || Turnbow (7) || Brewers || 22,173|| 16–31 || L1
|- style="background:#bfb;" 
| 48 || May 28 || @ Brewers || 9–6 || Rodriguez (1–1) || Sheets (1–4) || Lidge (9) || Brewers || 37,845 || 17–31 || W1
|- style="background:#bfb;" 
| 49 || May 29 || @ Brewers || 2–1 || Pettitte (3–5) || Capuano (4–4) || Lidge (10) || Brewers || 34,402 || 18–31 || W2
|- style="background:#fcc;" 
| 50 || May 30 || Reds || 0–9 || Harang (4–2) || Clemens (3–3) || — || Minute Maid Park || 42,097 || 18–32 || L1
|- style="background:#bfb;" 
| 51 || May 31 || Reds || 4–3 || Backe (5–3) || Belisle (2–5) || Lidge (11) || Minute Maid Park || 28,535 || 19–32 || W1
|-

|- style="background:#bfb;" 
| 52 || June 1 || Reds || 4–1 || Oswalt (6–6) || Ortiz (1–4) || Lidge (12) || Minute Maid Park || 31,571 || 20–32 || W2
|- style="background:#fcc;" 
| 53 || June 3 || Cardinals || 0–2 || Carpenter (8–3) || Pettitte (3–6) || Tavarez (3) || Minute Maid Park || 32,092 || 20–33 || L1
|- style="background:#fcc;" 
| 54 || June 4 || Cardinals || 9–11 || Marquis (7–3) || Rodriguez (1–2) || Isringhausen (17) || Minute Maid Park || 39,288 || 20–34 || L2
|- style="background:#bfb;" 
| 55 || June 5 || Cardinals || 6–4 || Clemens (4–3) || Mulder (7–3) || Lidge (13) || Minute Maid Park || 34,009 || 21–34 || W1
|- style="background:#fcc;"
| 56 || June 7 || @ Mets || 1–3 || Martinez (7–1) || Oswalt (6–7) ||  || Shea Stadium || 39,953 || 21–35 || L1
|- style="background:#bfb;"
| 57 || June 8 || @ Mets || 4–1 || Backe (6–3) || Zambrano (3–6) || Lidge (14) || Shea Stadium || 23,635 || 22–35 || W1
|- style="background:#bfb;"
| 58 || June 9 || @ Mets || 6–3  || Springer (1–2) || Bell (0–3) || Lidge (15) || Shea Stadium || 30,737 || 23–35 || W2
|- style="background:#bfb;"
| 59 || June 10 || Blue Jays || 4–2 || Rodriguez (2–2) || Lilly (3–7) || Lidge (16) || Minute Maid Park || 28,607 || 24–35 || W3
|- style="background:#bfb;"
| 60 || June 11 || Blue Jays || 6–3 || Lidge (2–2) || Schoeneweis (2–2) || || Minute Maid Park || 34,925 || 25–35 || W4
|- style="background:#bfb;"
| 61 || June 12 || Blue Jays || 3–0 || Oswalt (7–7) || Towers (5–5) || || Minute Maid Park || 30,584 || 26–35 || W5
|- style="background:#fcc;"
| 62 || June 13 || @ Orioles || 5–8 || Penn (1–0) || Backe (6–4) || Ryan (17)|| Oriole Park at Camden Yards || 23,297 || 26–36 || L1
|- style="background:#fcc;"
| 63 || June 14 || @ Orioles ||  1–6 || Chen (6–4) || Pettitte (3–7) || || Oriole Park at Camden Yards || 34,925 || 26–37 || L2
|- style="background:#fcc;"
| 64 || June 15 || @ Orioles ||  1–5 || Lopez (6–2) || Rodriguez (2–3) || || Oriole Park at Camden Yards || 31,547 || 26–38 || L3
|- style="background:#bfb;"
| 65 || June 17 || @ Royals || 7–0 || Clemens (5–3) || Howell (1–1) || || Kaufman Stadium || 27,385 || 27–38 || W1
|- style="background:#bfb;"
| 66 || June 18 || @ Royals || 6–2 || Oswalt (8–7) || Carrasco (2–2) || || Kaufman Stadium || 26,523 || 28–38 || W2
|- style="background:#fcc;"
| 67 || June 19 || @ Royals || 1–7 || Hernandez (5–7) || Backe (6–5) || || Kaufman Stadium || 20,214 || 28–39 || L1
|- style="background:#bfb;"
| 68 || June 20 || Rockies || 7–0 || Pettitte (4–7) || Kennedy (3–7) || || Minute Maid Park || 28,237 || 29–39 || W1
|- style="background:#bfb;"
| 69 || June 21 || Rockies || 6–5 || Qualls (2–3) || Wright (4–7) || Lidge (17)|| Minute Maid Park || 28,788 || 30–39 || W2
|- style="background:#bfb;"
| 70 || June 22 || Rockies || 6–2 || Clemens (6–3) || Jennings (4–8) || || Minute Maid Park || 39,415 || 31–39 || W3
|- style="background:#bfb;"
| 71 || June 24 || Rangers || 5–2 || Oswalt (9–7) || Rodriguez (2–1) || Lidge (18)|| Minute Maid Park || 36,199 || 32–39 || W4
|- style="background:#fcc;"
| 72 || June 25 || Rangers || 5–6 || Young (7–4) || Backe (6–6) || Cordero (18) || Minute Maid Park || 41,868 || 32–40 || L1
|- style="background:#bfb;"
| 73 || June 26 || Rangers || 3–2  || Qualls (3–3) || Dominguez (0–2) || || Minute Maid Park || 35,331 || 33–40 || W1
|- style="background:#bfb;"
| 74 || June 27 || @ Rockies || 11–5 || Rodriguez (3–3) || Wright (4–8) || || Coors Field || 21,877 || 34–40 || W2
|- style="background:#fcc;"
| 75 || June 28 || @ Rockies || 5–6 || Cortes (1–0) || Springer (1–3) || Fuentes (9)|| Coors Field || 28,726 || 34–41 || L1
|- style="background:#bfb;"
| 76 || June 29 || @ Rockies || 7–1 || Oswalt (10–7) || Kim (2–7) || || Coors Field || 23,494 || 35–41 || W2
|- style="background:# ;"
| 77 || June 30 || @ Reds || 2–2 ||  – || – || || Great American Ball Park || 19,903 || – || T1
|-

|- style="background:#bfb;"
| 78 || July 1 || @ Reds || 10–7 || Pettitte (5–7) || Hudson (1–3) || Wheeler (1) || Great American Ball Park || 24,923|| 36–41 || W2
|- style="background:#bfb;"
| 79 || July 2  || @ Reds || 4–3 || Rodriguez (4-3) || Harang (4-7)|| Wheeler (2) || Great American Ball Park || – || 37–41 || W3
|- style="background:#fcc;"
| 80 || July 2  || @ Reds || 6–11 || Ortiz (4–6)|| Astacio (0–4)|| — || Great American Ball Park || 28,236|| 37–42 || L1
|- style="background:#bfb;"
| 81 || July 3 || @ Reds || 9–0 || Clemens (7-3) || Claussen (4-6)|| — || Great American Ball Park || || 38–42 || W1
|- style="background:#bfb;"
| 82 || July 4 || Padres || 4–1 || Oswalt (11–7) ||Lawrence (5–7) || || Minute Maid Park || 40,550 || 39–42 || W2
|- style="background:#bfb;"
| 83 || July 5 || Padres || 6–2 || Backe (7–6)|| Reyes (3–2) || || Minute Maid Park || 27,307 || 40–42 || W3
|- style="background:#bfb;"
| 84 || July 6 || Padres || 5–4 || Pettitte (6–7) || Peavy (7–3)|| Wheeler (3) || Minute Maid Park || 29,774|| 41–42 || W4
|- style="background:#fcc;"
| 85 || July 7 || Padres || 5–7 || Williams (5–5)|| Rodriguez (4–4)|| Hoffman (24)|| Minute Maid Park || 28,810|| 41–43 || L1
|- style="background:#bfb;"
| 86 || July 8 || Dodgers || 3–2 || Lidge (3–2)|| Brazoban (2–3)|| || Minute Maid Park || 36,176 || 42–43 || W1
|- style="background:#bfb;"
| 87 || July 9 || Dodgers || 4–2 || Oswalt (12–7) || Weaver (7-8) ||Lidge (19) || Minute Maid Park || 37,196|| 43–43 || W2
|- style="background:#bfb;"
| 88 || July 10 || Dodgers || 6–5 || Sprnger (2-3) || Sanchez (2-4) ||Lidge (20)||Minute Maid Park  || 39,177|| 44–43 || W3
|- style="background:#bbcaff"
| – || July 12 || 76th All-Star Game || AL – NL || || || — || Comerica Park || || – || 
|- style="background:#fcc;"
|89|| July 15|| @ Cardinals || 3–4  || Thompson (1–0) ||Harville (0–1) || ||Busch Memorial Stadium||48,420 || 44–44|| L1
|- style="background:#fcc;"	
|90|| July 16|| @ Cardinals || 2–4|| Marquis (9-6) ||Oswalt (12–8)||Isringhausen (26) ||Busch Memorial Stadium||48,034 ||44–45||L2
|- style="background:#fcc;"
|91|| July 17|| @ Cardinals || 0–3|| Carpenter (14–4) ||Clemens (7–4) || ||Busch Memorial Stadium ||46,584 ||44–46 ||L3
|- style="background:#bfb;"
|92|| July 18|| @ Pirates || 11–1|| Backe (8–6)|| Williams (7–7) || || PNC Park ||17,590 || 45–46 || W1
|- style="background:#bfb;"
| 93 || July 19 || @ Pirates || 6–4 || Astacio (1–4) || Snell (0–1) || || PNC Park || – || 46–46 || W2
|- style="background:#bfb;"
| 94 || July 19  || @ Pirates || 8–0 || Rodgriguez (5–4) || Redman (4–10) || Lidge (21) || PNC Park || 20,552 || 47–46 || W3
|- style="background:#bfb;"
|95|| July 20|| @ Pirates || 8–0|| Pettitte (7–7) || Fogg (4–6)|| ||PNC Park||29,769 || 48–46 || W4
|- style="background:#bfb;"
|96|| July 21|| @ Nationals || 3–2	|| Oswalt (13–8) || Loaiza (6–6) ||Lidge (22) || Robert F. Kennedy Memorial Stadium||36,840 || 49–46 || W5 
|- style="background:#bfb;"
|97|| July 22|| @ Nationals || 14–1	|| Clemens (8–4)|| Drese (7–9)	 || ||Robert F. Kennedy Memorial Stadium||38,019 || 50–46 || W6	
|- style="background:#fcc;"
|98|| July 23|| @ Nationals || 2–4	|| Armas (5–4) || Backe (8–7) || Cordero (34)||Robert F. Kennedy Memorial Stadium||42,680 || 50–47 || L1	
|- style="background:#bfb;"
|99|| July 24|| @ Nationals || 4–1  || Springer (3–3) || Carrasco (3–3) || Lidge (23) || Robert F. Kennedy Memorial Stadium || 39,203 || 51–47 || W1
|- style="background:#bfb;"
|100|| July 25|| Phillies || 7–1|| Pettitte (8–7) || Lidle (8–9)|| ||Minute Maid Park||36,029|| 52–47 || W2 
|- style="background:#bfb;"
|101|| July 26|| Phillies|| 2–1 || Oswalt (14–8) || Madson (4–4)|| ||Minute Maid Park||33,867 || 53–47 || W3
|- style="background:#bfb;"
|102|| July 27|| Phillies || 3–2 || Clemens (9–4) || Padilla (5–9) ||Lidge (24)	||Minute Maid Park||38,071 || 54–47 || W4	
|- style="background:#bfb;"
|103|| July 28|| Mets|| 3–2 || Wheeler (1–2) || Hernandez (5–4) || ||Minute Maid Park||43,552 || 55–47 || W5
|- style="background:#bfb;"
|104|| July 29|| Mets|| 5–2|| Rodriguez (6–4) || Benson (7–4) || Lidge (25) ||Minute Maid Park||42,659 || 56–47 || W6
|- style="background:#bfb;"
|105|| July 30|| Mets || 2–0|| Pettitte (9–7) || Glavine (7–9) ||Lidge (26) ||Minute Maid Park||43,596 || 57–47 || W7
|- style="background:#fcc;"
|106|| July 31|| Mets || 4–9|| Heilman (4–3) || Wheeler (1–3) || ||Minute Maid Park||43,028 || 57–48 || L1
|-

|- style="background:#bfb;"
|107|| August 2 ||  @ Diamondbacks	|| 3–1 || Clemens (10–4) || Vargas (4–6) || Lidge (27) ||Bank One Ballpark||31,696 || 58–48 || W1 	
|- style="background:#bfb;"
|108|| August 3 ||  @ Diamondbacks|| 7–0 || Astacio (2–4) ||Vazquez (9–10) || || Bank One Ballpark||22,283 || 59–48 || W2
|- style="background:#fcc;"
|109|| August 4 ||  @ Diamondbacks||3–7 || Halsey (8–7) ||Rodriguez (6–5) || Valverde (3) ||Bank One Ballpark||23,217 || 59–49 || L1 	
|- style="background:#fcc;"
|110|| August 5 ||  @ Giants||0–4	|| Schmidt (8–6) || Pettitte (9–8) || || SBC Park|| 39,686 ||59–50 || L2
|- style="background:#fcc;"
|111|| August 6 ||  @ Giants||2–5	|| Lowry (7–11) ||Oswalt (14–9) || || SBC Park||41,959 || 59–51 || L3	
|- style="background:#bfb;"
|112|| August 7 ||  @ Giants||8–1|| Clemens (11–4) ||Eyre (2–2)|| || SBC Park||42,947 || 60–51 ||W1
|- style="background:#fcc;"
|113|| August 9 || Nationals|| 5–6 || Patterson (6–3) ||Astacio (2–5) ||Cordero (37) || Minute Maid Park || 34,255 || 60–52 || L1
|- style="background:#bfb;"
|114|| August 10 || Nationals|| 7–6 || Rodriguez (7–5) || Hernandez (13–5)  ||Lidge (28) || Minute Maid Park || 34,309 || 61–52 || W1
|- style="background:#bfb;"
|115|| August 11 || Nationals|| 6–3 || Pettitte (10–8) || Drese (7–12) || || Minute Maid Park ||35,036 || 62–52 || W2	 
|- style="background:#bfb;"
|116|| August 12 || Pirates || 6–5 || Wheeler (2–3) ||Rick White (3–5) ||Lidge (29) || Minute Maid Park ||37,524  || 63–52 || W3
|- style="background:#fcc;"
|117|| August 13 || Pirates || 0–1 || Torres (3–4) ||Lidge (3–3) || Mesa (27) || Minute Maid Park ||43,286 || 63–53 || L1	
|- style="background:#fcc;"
|118|| August 14 || Pirates || 0–8 || Williams (10–8) ||Astacio (2–6) || || Minute Maid Park ||36,872  || 63–54 || L2
|- style="background:#bfb;"
|119|| August 15 || Cubs || 12–4|| Rodriguez (8–5) || Rusch (5–5) || || Minute Maid Park ||26,992  || 64–54 || W1	
|- style="background:#fcc;"
|120|| August 16 || Cubs || 1–4|| Maddux (10–9) || Pettitte (10–9) || Dempster (17)|| Minute Maid Park ||31,963 	||64–55 || L1
|- style="background:#fcc;"
|121|| August 17 || Cubs ||2–4|| Zambrano (10–5) ||Oswalt (14–10) ||Dempster (18) || Minute Maid Park ||29,978 || 64–56 || L1
|- style="background:#fcc;"
|122|| August 18 || Brewers || 2–5 || Ohka (8–7) || Clemens (11–5) || Turnbow (27) || Minute Maid Park ||29,844 || 64–57 || L2
|- style="background:#bfb;"
|123|| August 19 || Brewers ||	5–3|| Springer (4–3) || Davis (9–9)|| Lidge (30) || Minute Maid Park ||31,651  || 65–57 || W1	
|- style="background:#fcc;"
|124|| August 20 || Brewers ||2–3|| Sheets (9–9) || Harville (0–2)|| || Minute Maid Park ||41,101  || 65–58 || L1
|- style="background:#bfb;"
|125|| August 21 || Brewers ||8–3||Pettitte (11–9) || Santos (4–12) || || Minute Maid Park ||35,712  || 66–58 || W1
|- style="background:#bfb;"
|126|| August 22 ||  @ Padres||6–2|| Oswalt (15–10) || Williams (6–10) || ||Petco Park||33,991 || 67–58 || W2
|- style="background:#fcc;"
|127|| August 23 ||  @ Padres||0–2|| Peavy (11–6) || Clemens (11–6) || ||Petco Park||37,985 || 67–59 || L1
|- style="background:#fcc;"
|128|| August 24 ||  @ Padres||4–7|| Park (11–6) || Rodriguez (8–6) ||Hoffman (32)||Petco Park||30,928  || 67–60 || L2
|- style="background:#bfb;"
|129|| August 26 ||  @ Dodgers	||2–1|| Pettitte (12–9) || Lowe (8–13) ||Lidge (31)||Dodger Stadium||41,638 || 68–60 || W1	
|- style="background:#fcc;"
|130|| August 27 ||  @ Dodgers	||3–8	||Jackson (1–1) || Oswalt (15–11) || || Dodger Stadium||51,738 || 68–61 || L1
|- style="background:#fcc;"
|131|| August 28 ||  @ Dodgers	||0–1	||Weaver (13–8) || Qualls (3–4) ||Sanchez (4)||Dodger Stadium||47,541 || 68–62 || L2
|- style="background:#bfb;"
|132|| August 30 || Reds ||5–2||Rodriguez (9–6)||Ortiz (8–10)|| || Minute Maid Park ||29,971 || 69–62 || W1
|- style="background:#bfb;"
|133|| August 31 || Reds||10–0||Pettitte (13–9) ||Claussen (9–9)|| || Minute Maid Park ||28,639 || 70–62 || W2
|-

|- style="background:#bfb;"
| 134||September 1 || Reds || 3–1|| Oswalt (16–11) || Harang (9–12) ||Lidge (32)|| Minute Maid Park ||27,490 || 71–62 || W3
|- style="background:#bfb;"
| 135||September 2||Cardinals || 6–5  || Qualls (4–4) || Tavarez (2–3) || ||  Minute Maid Park || 38,511 || 72–62 || W4
|- style="background:#fcc;"
| 136	||September 3|| Cardinals||2–4|| Carpenter (20–4) || Springer (4–4)|| || Minute Maid Park ||42,817 || 72–63 || L1
|- style="background:#fcc;"
| 137	||September 4|| Cardinals||1–4|| Marquis (11–13) || Rodriguez (9–7)|| || Minute Maid Park ||38,277 || 72–64 || L2
|- style="background:#bfb;"
| 138	||September 5 || @ Phillies ||4–3||Pettitte (14–9)|| Myers (12–7) || Lidge (33) || Citizens Bank Park|| 36,144 || 73–64 || W1
|- style="background:#bfb;"
| 139	||September 6 || @ Phillies ||2–1|| Oswalt (17–11) || Wagner (4–2)||Lidge (34)||Citizens Bank Park||30,600||74–64 || W2
|- style="background:#bfb;"
| 140	||September 7 || @ Phillies ||8–6|| Qualls (5–4) || Wagner (4–3) || Lidge (35)||Citizens Bank Park||29,026 || 75–64 || W3
|- style="background:#fcc;"
| 141	||September 9|| @Brewers	||4–7|| Davis (10–10) || Clemens (11–7) ||Turnbow (30) ||Miller Park||18,130 || 75–65 || L1
|- style="background:#bfb;"
| 142	||September 10|| @ Brewers||7–5	||Pettitte (15–9) || Ohka (10–8) || Lidge (36)||Miller Park||24,437 || 76–65 || W1
|- style="background:#fcc;"
| 143	||September 11 || @ Brewers||2–4|| Helling (2–0) || Oswalt (17–12) || Turnbow (31)||Miller Park||17,392 ||76–66 || L1
|- style="background:#fcc;"
| 144	||September 12|| Marlins||2–8||	Willis (21–8) || Backe (8–8)|| || Minute Maid Park ||27,538 || 76–67 || L2
|- style="background:#fcc;"
| 145	||September 13|| Marlins||2–4||	Beckett (14–8) || Rodriguez (9–8) || Jones (37)	|| Minute Maid Park ||31,512||76–68 || L3
|- style="background:#bfb;"
| 146	||September 14|| Marlins||10–2||Clemens (12–7) || Burnett (12–11) ||  || Minute Maid Park ||30,911	|| 77–68 || W1
|- style="background:#bfb;"
| 147	||September 15|| Marlins||4–1||	Pettitte (16–9) || Vargas (5–4) || Lidge (37)|| Minute Maid Park ||35,960 || 78–68 || W2
|- style="background:#bfb;"
| 148	||September 16|| Brewers ||2–1 || Lidge (4–3) || Eveland (1–1)|| || Minute Maid Park ||33,767 || 79–68 || W3
|- style="background:#bfb;"
| 149	||September 17|| Brewers	||7–0	||Backe (9–8) ||Obermuller (1–4)|| || Minute Maid Park ||37,756 || 80–68 || W4
|- style="background:#bfb;"	
| 150	||September 18|| Brewers	||6–1 ||Rodriguez (10–8) || Capuano (17–10)|| || Minute Maid Park ||35,052	|| 81–68 || W5
|- style="background:#fcc;"
| 151	||September 19|| @ Pirates||0–7 ||Snell (1–2) ||Clemens (12–8)	|| ||PNC Park||13,865 || 81–69 || L1	 
|- style="background:#bfb;"
| 152	||September 20|| @ Pirates||7–4||Pettitte (17–9) || Gorzelanny (0–1)|| || PNC Park||12,927 || 82–69 || W1
|- style="background:#bfb;" 
| 153	||September 21 || @ Pirates||12–8||Oswalt (18–12) ||Wells (7–17)|| ||PNC Park||16,266 || 83–69 || W2
|- style="background:#bfb;"
| 154	||September 22 || @ Pirates||2–1||Backe (10–8) ||Duke (6–2) ||Lidge (38) || PNC Park||12,587 || 84–69 || W3
|- style="background:#fcc;"
| 155	||September 23|| @ Cubs	||4–5|| Rusch (8–8) ||Rodriguez (10–9) ||Dempster (30)||Wrigley Field||38,622 || 84–70 || L1
|- style="background:#bfb;"	 	
| 156	||September 24|| @ Cubs	||8–3 ||Astacio (3–6) || Zambrano (14–6)||	||Wrigley Field||39,263	|| 85–70 || W1
|- style="background:#fcc;"
| 157	||September 25|| @ Cubs	||2–3 ||Williams (6–9) ||Gallo (0–1) ||Dempster (31)||Wrigley Field||38,121 || 85–71 || L1
|- style="background:#bfb;" 	
| 158	||September 27|| @ Cardinals	||3–1 ||Oswalt (19–12) ||Morris (14–10) ||Lidge (39)	||Busch Memorial Stadium||40,260 || 86–71 || W1	
|- style="background:#bfb;" 
| 159	||September 28|| @ Cardinals	||7–6 ||Qualls (6–4) ||Isringhausen (1–2) || Lidge (40)	||Busch Memorial Stadium||40,616 || 87–71 || W2	 
|- style="background:#fcc;"
|160	||September 29 || Cubs || 2–3|| Rusch (9–8) ||Rodriguez (10–10) ||Dempster (32) || Minute Maid Park ||37,820||87–72	||W3
|- style="background:#fcc;"
|161	||September 30 || Cubs ||3–4||Novoa (4–5) ||Lidge (4–4) ||Dempster (33)|| Minute Maid Park ||41,304||87–73 || L1
|- 

|- style="background:#bfb;"
| 162 || October 1 || Cubs || 3–1 || Clemens (13–8) || Williams (6–10) || Lidge (41) || Minute Maid Park || 42,021|| 88–73 || W1
|- style="background:#bfb;"
| 163 || October 2 || Cubs || 6–4 || Oswalt (20–12) || Maddux (13–15) || Lidge (42) || Minute Maid Park || 42,288|| 89–73 || W2
|-

Postseason log

|- style="text-align:center; background:#cfc;"
| 1 || October 5 || @ Braves || 10–5 || Pettitte (1–0)  || Hudson (0–1) || — || 40,590 || 1–0
|- style="text-align:center; background:#fcc;"
| 2 || October 6 || @ Braves || 1–7 || Smoltz (1–0) || Clemens (0–1) || — || 46,181 || 1–1
|- style="text-align:center; background:#cfc;"
| 3 || October 8 || Braves || 7–3 || Oswalt (1–0) || Sosa (0–1) || — || 43,759 || 2–1
|- style="text-align:center; background:#cfc;"
| 4 || October 9 || Braves || 7–6 (18) || Clemens (1–1) || Devine (0–1) || — || 43,413 || 3–1
|-

|- style="text-align:center; background:#fcc;"
| 1 || October 12 || @ Cardinals || 3–5 || Chris Carpenter (2–0) || Pettitte (1–1) || Isringhausen (2) || 52,332 || 0–1
|- style="text-align:center; background:#cfc;"
| 2 || October 13 || @ Cardinals || 4–1 || Oswalt (2–0) || Mulder (1–1) || Lidge (1) || 52,358 || 1–1
|- style="text-align:center; background:#cfc;"
| 3 || October 15 || Cardinals || 4–3 || Clemens (2–1) || Morris (1–1) || Lidge (2) || 42,823 || 2–1
|- style="text-align:center; background: #cfc;"
| 4 || October 16 || Cardinals || 2–1 || Qualls (1–0) || Marquis (0–1) || Lidge (3) || 43,010 || 3–1
|- style="text-align:center; background:#fcc;"
| 5 || October 17 || Cardinals || 4–5 || Isringhausen (1–0) || Lidge (0–1) || — ||  43,470 || 3–2
|- style="text-align:center; background:#cfc;"
| 6 || October 19 || @ Cardinals || 7–1 || Oswalt (3–0) || Mulder (1–2) || — ||  52,438 || 4–2 
|-

|- style="text-align:center; background:#fcc"
| 1 || October 22 || @ White Sox || 3–5 || Contreras (3–1) || Rodriguez (0–1) || Jenks (3) || 41,206 || 0–1
|- style="text-align:center; background:#fcc"
| 2 || October 23 || @ White Sox || 6–7 || Cotts (1–0) || Lidge (0–2) || — || 41,432 || 0–2
|- style="text-align:center; background:#fcc"
| 3 || October 25 || White Sox || 5–7 (14) || Marte (1–0) || Astacio (0–1) || Buehrle (1) || 42,848 || 0–3
|- style="text-align:center; background:#fcc"
| 4 || October 26 || White Sox || 0–1 || Garcia (1–0) || Lidge (0–3) || Jenks (4) || 42,936 || 0–4
|-

Postseason
National League Divisional Playoffs
The Astros faced a rematch in the Atlanta Braves in the Division Series. This was the fifth time the two teams had met in the postseason (1997, 1999, 2001, 2004, 2005), and the Astros were looking to add on reaching the second round of the postseason in back-to-back years; the two teams had met for six games in the regular season, for which Houston won only once. In Game 1 in Atlanta, the Astros struck first on a Morgan Ensberg RBI single, but Chipper Jones tied the game as the first inning ended. Ensberg gave the Astros the lead again on a bases-loaded single made it 3–1. Craig Biggio hit a sacrifice fly to drive in Brad Ausmus to make it 4–1 in the fourth, but Andruw Jones cut into the lead with a two-run shot to make it 4–3. Enberg struck again in the seventh with a RBI hit to drive in Andy Pettitte after he had hit a double. The Astros finally broke the game all the way through in the eighth, scoring five runs on the bases of four hits, three walks, and a wild pitch. The Astros prevailed in Game 1 by a score of 10–5. Despite having Roger Clemens on the mound for Game 2, he was outmatched by John Smoltz, who allowed just one run while the Braves used the efforts of rookie Brian McCann (who hit a three-run shot in the second) to win 7–1.

Back in Houston for Game 3, the Astros struck first again by the efforts of Morgan Ensberg and Jason Lane, who made it 2-0 after one inning. McCann and pitcher Jorge Sosa tied the game on hits with two out in the next inning, but Mike Lamb would hit a home run in the third inning to make it 3–2. In the seventh, the Astros took advantage of Chris Reitsma (and others) on the mound, scoring four runs in the inning after hits by Lance Berkman, Ensberg and Lane went with a sacrifice fly by Adam Everett; the Astros prevailed 7–3. Game 4 proved to be a classic for the ages despite its initial misgivings for Houston. Adam LaRoche hit a grand slam off Brandon Backe to make it 4–0 in the third inning. The Braves added another run in the fifth that was matched by Houston, but the Braves scored in the top of the eighth inning with a McCann home run off Wandy Rodriguez to make it 6–1. However, the Astros would strike back, doing so when Lance Berkman hit a grand slam off Kyle Farnsworth to make it 6–5. Then, in the ninth inning with two out, Brad Ausmus stepped up to the plate against Farnsworth and proceeded to hit a home run, tying the game at six that sent it to extra innings. The two teams traded zeroes for the next eight innings while setting a record for the longest postseason game in MLB history; Roger Clemens pitched three innings of relief due to a lack of relievers. In the bottom of the 18th, with Joey Devine on the mound for Atlanta, Chris Burke would line a shot to left field that cleared the scoreboard for a walk-off home run. This was the second postseason series victory for the Astros, and it sent them back to the National League Championship Series.

National League Championship Series

The opponent for the Astros in the Championship Series was a familiar foe: the St. Louis Cardinals, their rival in the National League Central. They had previously matched up against each other in the previous NLCS, which saw the Astros lose in seven games, needing only one more win to reach the Series. The Cardinals had won 100 games and had beaten Houston in eleven of sixteen games this season (worst among their division foes) Game 1 was controlled by St. Louis from the jump. Reggie Sanders hit a two-out homerun with David Eckstein on base to make it 2–0. A sacrifice bunt by the pitcher drove in a third run in the second inning. Eckstein drove a run in with a single while Albert Pujols capped the scoring for the Cardinals with a single. The only scoring for Houston came late, as Chris Burke hit a two-run shot off the bullpen to make it 5–2 in the seventh before Brad Ausmus hit a sacrifice fly to make it 5–3, but reliever Jason Isringhausen finished the Astros off with no further damage. This was the fifth straight loss for the Astros in a postseason game played in St. Louis. Game 2 proved a different story. Burke lined a tripe with one out and then scored later when Cardinals pitcher Mark Mulder threw a ball past the catcher. Brad Ausmus lined a double in the fifth inning and then was driven home on a bunt and ground out to make it 2–0. Albert Pujols lined a home run to start the sixth inning, but the Cardinals were out-hit 11-6 and scored no more; Burke and Adam Everett would lend a hand with RBI hits to even the series at one.

In Game 3 back in Houston, Mike Lamb hit a two-run shot off Matt Morris to give them a 2–0 lead in the fourth inning. Roger Clemens would allow back-to-back hits in the fifth and sixth inning that saw the Cardinals score a run each to tie the game. However, in the sixth inning, Lamb hit a double that set him up to score when Jason Lane hit a single. A further single lead to Adam Everett at the plate, who hit into a fielder's choice that made it 4–2. While the Cardinals scored a run in the ninth inning on an RBI double, they could not crack Brad Lidge (who until this game had allowed no runs against St. Louis since May 2003) as Houston now led the Series. Game 4 was a tight affair that saw the bullpens flicker more than the offense, which saw eleven combined hits lead to three runs. Pujols gave the Cardinals the lead on a sacrifice fly in the 4th, but Jason Lane hit a home run off Jeff Suppan to tie it. In the seventh inning, the Astros had the bases loaded with less than two outs. With Morgan Ensberg at the plate, he hit a flyout that gave enough room to score a run from the third base. The Cardinals had a prime chance in the ninth inning when Lidge allowed back-to-back singles, but this would be followed by a groundball that led to a play at the plate that saw Pujols out at home for one out. John Mabry then grounded into a double play to give Houston a 3–1 lead. In Game 5, the Astros were one away from history. Craig Biggio started the scoring with an RBI single in the second, but St. Louis responded by hitting a single with the bases loaded to drive in two runs. In the seventh inning, with two on base and starter Chris Carpenter trying to go through the inning clean, Lance Berkman hit a home run to give the Astros a 4–2 lead. It set the stage for a pivotal ninth inning with Lidge set to close the inning. He got two easy outs before Eckstein lined a single with two strikes; this was followed by Jim Edmonds drawing a walk. Lidge now faced Albert Pujols at the plate; he hit a shot to left field that would give St. Louis a 5–4 lead that proved the difference in making the series now 3–2 in favor of Houston. Game 6, played at Busch Stadium, was a rematch between Game 2 starters Roy Oswalt and Mark Mulder. Houston set up the scoring with getting runners on second and third base in the third inning before Mulder threw a wild pitch that scored a run; Biggio then hit a single to drive in the other runner to make it 2–0. Jason Lane hit his second home run of the series in the fourth inning to make it 3–0. Roy Oswalt would dominate the Cardinals for seven innings, allowing only a run on a sacrifice fly in the fifth inning as the bullpen took control from there while adding two insurance runs in the sixth and seventh. With Dan Wheeler on the mound, Yadier Molina hit a flyball to right field that was caught by Jason Lane for the final out, clinching the first ever pennant for the Astros in history. Oswalt, who went 2–0 with a 1.29 ERA in 14 innings, was named NLCS MVP, the second time an Astro had won the award and first since Mike Scott in 1986.

World Series

After having played 4,714 games and their entire major league careers together in Houston, Bagwell and Biggio appeared in their first World Series in 2005.

Game 1
October 22, 2005 at U.S. Cellular Field in Chicago

Playing in their first World Series home game since 1959, the White Sox took an early lead with a home run from Jermaine Dye in the first inning. The Sox scored two more in the second when Juan Uribe doubled in A. J. Pierzynski after Carl Everett had already scored on a groundout earlier in the inning. The Astros responded again in the next inning when Lance Berkman hit a double, driving in Adam Everett and Craig Biggio. In the White Sox half of the fourth, Joe Crede hit what turned out to be the game-winning home run. In the bottom of the eighth, Scott Podsednik hit a triple with Pierzynski on second. Roger Clemens recorded his shortest World Series start, leaving after the second inning with 53 pitches including 35 for strikes, due to a sore hamstring that he had previously injured (and caused him to miss his last regular season start) as the loss went to Wandy Rodríguez. José Contreras pitched seven innings, allowing three runs on six hits for the win, and Bobby Jenks earned the save to give the White Sox a 1–0 lead in the series. When Neal Cotts entered the game in the top of the 8th it marked the first time in 5 games that the White Sox had gone to their bullpen.

Game 2
October 23, 2005 at U.S. Cellular Field in Chicago

On a miserably cold (51 degrees) and rainy evening, Morgan Ensberg's first-pitch home run off starter Mark Buehrle put the Astros on top in the second inning. The White Sox answered in the bottom of the second with two runs of their own off Andy Pettitte. Lance Berkman drove in three runs in the game, two of them on a go-ahead double in the top of the fifth. In the seventh inning, Dan Wheeler loaded the bases with a double to Juan Uribe, a walk to Tadahito Iguchi, and home plate umpire Jeff Nelson's ruling that Jermaine Dye was hit by a pitched ball. The ruling was considered questionable, as television replays showed that the ball hit Dye's bat (which would have made the pitch a foul ball rather than a HBP). The Astros brought in Chad Qualls, who promptly served up a grand slam to Paul Konerko on the very first pitch he threw, the eighteenth grand slam in the annals of the Fall Classic. In the top of the ninth, White Sox closer Bobby Jenks blew the save when he gave up a two-run game-tying pinch hit single to José Vizcaíno. In the bottom half of the ninth, Astros closer Brad Lidge gave up a one-out, walk-off home run — the fourteenth in Series history — to Scott Podsednik, giving Lidge his second loss in as many post-season appearances (his previous appearance was in Game 5 of 2005 National League Championship Series). Podsednik had not hit a single homer in the regular season, and this was his second of the postseason. The Series moved to Houston with the White Sox leading 2–0.

Game 3
October 25, 2005 at Minute Maid Park in Houston, Texas

Game 3 was the first ever World Series game played in the state of Texas.  Before the game, it was ruled by Commissioner Bud Selig that the retractable roof would be open at Minute Maid Park, weather permitting. The Astros objected, citing that their record in games with the roof closed was better than with the retractable roof open. Selig's office claimed that the ruling was based on the rules established by Houston and were consistent with how the Astros organization treated the situation all year long, as well as the weather forecasts for that period of time.

In the game – the longest World Series game in length of time (five hours and forty-one minutes) and tied for the longest in number of innings (fourteen, tied with Game 2 of the 1916 World Series) – Lance Berkman singled with one out after a Craig Biggio lead-off double in the bottom of the first as the Astros struck early. The White Sox had a rally snuffed in the top of the second inning; after Paul Konerko hit a lead-off double and A. J. Pierzynski walked, Aaron Rowand hit into a line-drive double play. Adam Everett caught the ball and then doubled Konerko off second by flipping the ball to Biggio, who stepped on the bag. Houston scored in the bottom of the third when Everett led off with a walk. Everett got caught in a rundown and got hit by the ball on a Juan Uribe throwing error that hit Everett. A Roy Oswalt sacrifice bunt and a Biggio single sent Everett home. Berkman singled again with two out, sending Biggio to third. Then Morgan Ensberg singled Biggio home for the third run of the game. Jason Lane led off the Astros' fourth with a home run to left-center field. It was later shown in replays that the ball should not have been ruled a home run, hitting the left side of the yellow line on the unusual wall in left-center field.

The White Sox rallied in the top of the fifth, true to their "Win Or Die Trying" mantra of 2005, starting with a Joe Crede lead-off homer. Uribe, on first after hitting a single, scored on a Tadahito Iguchi base hit with one out, followed by Scott Podsednik coming home on a duck-snort single by Jermaine Dye. Pierzynski hit a two-out double to Tal's Hill, driving in two runs, scoring Iguchi and Dye giving the White Sox the lead. The Astros rallied in the last of the eighth with two outs when Lane's double scored Ensberg with the tying run after back-to-back walks by Ensberg and Mike Lamb, giving Dustin Hermanson a blown save. Houston tried to rally to win in the ninth, but stranded Chris Burke at third, after he had walked, reached second on an error and stolen third.

The Astros tried again in the tenth as well as in the eleventh, but failed each time. In the top of the fourteenth, after the Sox hit into a spectacular double play started by Ensberg, Geoff Blum (a former Astro) homered to right with two outs off Ezequiel Astacio. After two infield singles by Rowand and Crede that went a total of 150 feet according to McCarver, Uribe walked, and then Chris Widger walked thanks to Astacio's sudden wildness. The Astros tried to rally with the tying runs on first and third and two outs after a Uribe error, but Game 2 starter Mark Buehrle earned the save for winning pitcher Dámaso Marte when Everett popped out, bringing the White Sox one game closer to their first World Championship in eighty-eight years. Buehrle became the first pitcher ever to start a game in the Series, and save the next one.

Many records were set or tied in the game besides time and innings: The teams combined to use seventeen pitchers (nine for the White Sox, eight for the Astros), throwing a total of 482 pitches, and walking twenty-one batters combined (a dozen by Chicago, nine by Houston); forty-three players were used (the White Sox used twenty-two and the Astros used twenty-one), and thirty men were left on base (fifteen for each team), all new high-water marks in their categories in Fall Classic history. Scott Podsednik set a new all-time record with eight official-at-bats in this game. One record that was tied was most double plays turned, with six (four by the Astros, two by the White Sox).

Game 4
October 26, 2005 at Minute Maid Park in Houston, Texas

Before the game, Major League Baseball unveiled its Latino Legends Team.

The fourth game was the pitchers' duel that had been promised throughout the series. Both Houston starter Brandon Backe and Chicago starter Freddy García put zeros on the scoreboard through seven innings, the longest since Game 7 of the 1991 World Series. Scott Podsednik had a two-out triple in the top of the third, but Tadahito Iguchi grounded out to second, thus snuffing that threat. The Astros had the best chance of scoring in the sixth, but Jason Lane struck out with the bases loaded to end that rally. The White Sox had a chance in the top of the seventh with runners at second and third and two out, but shortstop Juan Uribe struck out to snuff the rally. The White Sox were able to break through in the next inning against embattled Houston closer Brad Lidge. Willie Harris hit a pinch-hit single. Podsednik moved Harris to second with a sacrifice bunt. Carl Everett pinch-hit for Iguchi and grounded out to the right side to allow Harris to move over to third. Jermaine Dye, the Most Valuable Player of the series, had the game-winning single, driving in Harris.

Things got a little sticky for the Sox in the Astros half of the eighth when reliever Cliff Politte hit Willy Taveras, threw a wild pitch, sending Taveras to second, and walked Lance Berkman. After Morgan Ensberg flew out to center, ChiSox manager Ozzie Guillén brought in Neal Cotts to finish the inning. Cotts induced pinch-hitter José Vizcaíno into a ground out to Uribe. Bobby Jenks, the 24-year-old fireballer, started the ninth inning. He allowed a single to Jason Lane and a sacrifice bunt to Brad Ausmus. Chris Burke came in to pinch-hit; he fouled one off to the left side, but Uribe made an amazing catch in the stands to retire Burke.

The game ended when Orlando Palmeiro grounded to Uribe. It was a bang-bang play as Paul Konerko caught the ball from Uribe at 11:01 p.m. CDT to begin the biggest celebration in Chicago since the sixth NBA championship by the Bulls in 1998, and end the second-longest period without a World Series title (the cross-town Chicago Cubs owned the longest such streak at the time, as they had not won since 1908, until winning in 2016). The 1–0 shutout was the first 1-run game to end a World Series since the 1995 World Series, in which Game 6 was won by the Atlanta Braves over the Cleveland Indians, and the first 1–0 game in any Series game since Game 5 of the 1996 World Series when the New York Yankees shut out the Braves in the last game ever played at Atlanta–Fulton County Stadium.

Composite Box
2005 World Series (4-0): Chicago White Sox (A.L.) over Houston Astros (N.L.)

Awards and honors
 Craig Biggio, Hutch Award
 Roy Oswalt, 2005 National League Championship Series Most Valuable PlayerAll-Star Game Roger Clemens, pitcher, reserve
 Brad Lidge, pitcher, reserve
 Roy Oswalt, pitcher, reserve
 Morgan Ensberg, third base, reserve
 Inducted into Texas Sports Hall of Fame: Jeff Bagwell
 Craig Biggio

Farm system

References

External links

2005 Houston Astros season at Baseball ReferenceGame Logs:1st Half: Houston Astros Game Log on ESPN.com
2nd Half: Houston Astros Game Log on ESPN.comBatting Statistics: Houston Astros Batting Stats on ESPN.comPitching Statistics:''' Houston Astros Pitching Stats on ESPN.com

National League champion seasons
Houston Astros seasons
Houston Astros Season, 2005
Houston Astros Season, 2005
2005 in sports in Texas